Shraddha Satyawan Chavan (born 6 October 1988) is a Maharashtrian cricketer. She has played for Mumbai and West Zone. She has played 18 Limited over matches and 15 Women's Twenty20.

References 

Mumbai women cricketers
West Zone women cricketers
1988 births
Cricketers from Mumbai
Living people